Ravenstone with Snibston is a civil parish in the North West Leicestershire district of Leicestershire, England.  According to the 2001 census it had a population of 2,149, increasing to 2,212 (including Donington le Heath) at the 2011 census. The parish includes Ravenstone, part of Snibston and the hamlet of Sinope. The parish was created in 1884.

References

Civil parishes in Leicestershire
North West Leicestershire District